Don Benson (9 April 1920 – 12 June 2019) was an Australian rules footballer who played with Richmond in the Victorian Football League (VFL).

Benson played 110 games for Yallourn between 1937 and 1945, including their 1939 premiership.

Notes

External links 

Tigers Archive Profile

1920 births
2019 deaths
Australian rules footballers from Victoria (Australia)
Richmond Football Club players